The 2005–06 Cymru Alliance was the sixteenth season of the Cymru Alliance after its establishment in 1990. The league was won by Glantraeth.

League table

External links
Cymru Alliance

Cymru Alliance seasons
2
Wales